Cost center may also refer to:
 Cost Sports Center, the indoor athletic facility often referred to by the same name
 Cost centre (business), the part of an organization that does not produce direct profit and adds to the cost of running a company